Peter Lewis may refer to:

Peter Lewis (announcer), former British television continuity announcer
Peter B. Lewis (1933–2013), American businessman
Peter Lewis (musician) (born 1945), founder member of the band Moby Grape
Pete "Guitar" Lewis (1913–1970), American R&B guitarist with Johnny Otis
Peter Lewis (died 1985), member of the Manchester band The Scorpions
Peter Lewis (politician) (1942–2017), Australian politician
Peter Lewis (rugby league) (born 1979), rugby league player
Peter Scott Lewis (born 1953), American composer
Peter Lewis (British Army officer) (1918–2008), British soldier, journalist and author
Peter Lewis (cyclist) (born 1990), Australian cyclist
Peter Lewis (dog trainer), British dog trainer
Peter Edwin Lewis (1912–1976), British judge and politician
Peter Lewis (prosecutor), British prosecutor
Peter Lewis (priest) (fl. 1559–1572) a Dean of Lismore and a Precentor of Christ Church Cathedral, Dublin
Peter Lewis, co-owner of Essential Media Communications, an Australian PR and polling company, and Guardian Australia columnist
Peter Lewis, chair of Australians for Native Title and Reconciliation from c.2019

See also
Jon Peter Lewis (born 1979), American singer and songwriter
Lewis (surname)